The 1821 Rhode Island gubernatorial election was an election held on April 18, 1821 to elect the Governor of Rhode Island. William C. Gibbs, the Democratic-Republican nominee, beat Samuel W. Bridgham, the Federalist candidate, with 56.97% of the vote.

General election

Candidates
William C. Gibbs, member of the Rhode Island General Assembly 1816-1820.
Samuel W. Bridgham, Attorney General of Rhode Island 1814-1817.

Results

County results

References

Notes

Rhode Island gubernatorial elections
1821 Rhode Island elections
Rhode Island
April 1821 events